Moongar Peh (also Romanized as Mooongar Peh) is a village in Barikrood Rural District, Dehferi District, Fereydunkenar County, Mazandaran Province, Iran. At the 2006 census, its population was 453, in 115 families.

References 

Populated places in Fereydunkenar County